Helgheim Church is a parish church of the Church of Norway in Sunnfjord Municipality in Vestland county, Norway. It is located in the village of Helgheim, right on the shore of the lake Jølstravatnet. It is the church for the Helgheim parish which is part of the Sunnfjord prosti (deanery) in the Diocese of Bjørgvin. The white, wooden church was built in a long church style in 1877 by the architect Jacob Wilhelm Nordan. The church seats about 500 people.

History
The earliest existing historical records of the church date back to the year 1322, but the church was not new at that time. The first church at Helgheim was likely a wooden stave church that was built during the 13th century. The medieval church was torn down during the first half of the 1600s and replaced with a timber-framed long church, possibly built in stages over a number of years.

By the 1870s, a new church was needed, so plans were made to replace the old church. The new church was designed by Jacob Wilhelm Nordan and built by builder Ole Vangberg. In 1876, construction of a new church was begun beside the old church (and slightly overlapping the footprint of the old building). The old church was torn down as the construction progressed. The new church was consecrated on 28 November 1877 by the Bishop Peter Hersleb Graah Birkeland. In 1952, a major renovation of the church was carried out. Part of this included removing the windows in the choir. The basic premise was that the bright light from the windows was distracting to the priest when facing the altar and it was hard to see the priest for the people in the nave. After the windows were removed, more lights were needed in the choir ceiling and artwork was hung where the windows were once located. In connection with the renovation, the many pillars holding up the 2nd floor seating gallery were clad with boards and painted.

Media gallery

See also
List of churches in Bjørgvin

References

Sunnfjord
Churches in Vestland
Long churches in Norway
Wooden churches in Norway
19th-century Church of Norway church buildings
Churches completed in 1877
13th-century establishments in Norway